The Game Is Thick ... Part 2 is the eleventh and final studio album by Bay Area rapper Mac Dre released on October 19, 2004. The album was released just 13 days before an unknown assailant shot and killed Hicks while driving on a freeway in Kansas City, Missouri. 
The album name and cover gives nod to the 1988 album, "The Game Is Thick", by fellow Vallejo, California rapper, The MAC. Who was an associate of Mac Dre before his passing in 1991.

Track listing
 "Tha Introduction"
 "Get Loud" (featuring Bad Business)
 "Cutthoat Soup"
 "Retro Dance Record"
 "It Ain't Funny" (featuring Rydah J. Klyde)
 "Don't Hate tha Playa"
 "Cal Bear"
 "Hotta Den Steam" (featuring PSD)
 "Fedi's Theme" (featuring Mob Figaz & Meezy Montana)
 "4 Much" (featuring Yukmouth)
 "Screw-E-Boo-Boo" (featuring Black Jesus)
 "Stool Pigeon" (featuring Dubee)
 "Same Hood" (featuring Vital)

2004 albums
Mac Dre albums
Thizz Entertainment albums
Sequel albums